Ardeley is a small village and civil parish in East Hertfordshire, England. The parish includes the hamlet of Cromer, as well as Wood End and Moor Green.

Description
Ardeley village has a number of thatched cottages beside the green, a thatched village hall, a vicarage built in the 18th century and a CSA farm (Church Farm).  It also has a children's play area near the school, at the end of school lane, five housing association/ex-council houses in "The Crescent", opposite the school and a number of church-let cottages.
The international cleaning company, Hughes Gardner, are now based in the manor house. Other buildings of interest include
Church of Saint Lawrence (Church of England)

The Grade I listed church dates from around the 13th century.
Pub
The Grade II listed pub "The Jolly Waggoner"
School
The primary school, Ardeley St. Lawrence JMI, founded in 1835, is a Church of England state funded school.

Events
Ardeley has an annual fete from which profits go to the parish.

People
The Chauncy family lived at Ardeley Bury, the manor house of the village.
Charles Chauncy, third president of Harvard College, was baptised in Ardeley on 5 November 1592.
Sir Henry Chauncy was born in Ardeley in 1632. He wrote Antiquities of Hertfordshire which was published in 1700.

References

External links

 Ardeley (A Guide to Old Hertfordshire)
 

East Hertfordshire District
Civil parishes in Hertfordshire
Villages in Hertfordshire